The women's high jump at the 1962 British Empire and Commonwealth Games as part of the athletics programme was held at the Perry Lakes Stadium on Monday 26 November 1962.

The event was won by 19-year-old Australian Robyn Woodhouse in her first international competition. Woodhouse won by two inches ahead of her fellow countrywomen Helen Frith and Michele Mason, the defending champion. Woodhouse's jump of  set four new records. The jump placed Woodhouse only behind the world record holder, Romania's Iolanda Balaș, who had cleared .

This was one five events at the 1962 Games where Australia won the clean sweep of medals. The others were the women's long jump, the men's 440 yard freestyle, men's 1650 yard freestyle and the men's 220 yard butterfly.

Records

Final

References

Women's high jump
1962